Salt of the Earth: Palestinian Christians in the Northern West Bank is a series of documentary short films examining the lives of nine Palestinian Christians living in and around the cities of Jenin and Nablus.  Released by Salt Films, Inc., in 2004, the film was produced by Presbyterian missionaries Marthame and Elizabeth Sanders while they lived and worked in the Palestinian Christian village of Zababdeh.

External links
 
 Salt Films, Inc. webpage

2004 films
2004 documentary films
Documentary films about Christianity
Palestinian documentary films